Ashrafuz Zaman Khan (born February 28, 1948) is one of the convicted masterminds of 1971 killing of Bengali intellectuals. In 1971, he was a member of the Central Committee of the Islami Chhatra Sangha. After liberation he went to Pakistan and worked for Radio Pakistan. Later, he moved to New York and presently heads the Queens branch of Islamic Circle of North America (ICNA). He was sentenced to death in absentia by the International War Crimes Tribunal for killing 18 Bengali intellectuals during the last days of the 1971 Liberation War of Bangladesh.

Activities as a commander of Al Badr
Ashrafuzzaman Khan shot to death seven teachers of Dhaka University in the killing zones at Mirpur.  Mofizzuddin, who drove the vehicle that carried those victims to Mirpur, clearly identified Ashrafuzzaman as the "chief killer" of the intellectuals.

After 1971 War
After Liberation, Ashrafuzzaman's personal diary was recovered from his residence, 350 East Nakhalpara. Two pages of his diary registered names and residential addresses of 19 teachers as well as the name of the medical officer of Dhaka University. Of those 20 persons, 8 were missing on December 14: Munier Chowdhury (Bengali), Dr. Abul Khair (History), Ghiasuddin Ahmed (History), Rashidul Hasan (English), Dr. Faizul Mohi (IE R) and Dr. Murtaza (Medical Officer).

Mofizuddin confessed that Ashrafuzzaman himself shot all of them. As per Mofizuddin's description, the decomposed bodies of those unfortunate teachers were recovered from the swamps of Rayer Bazar and the mass grave at Shiyal Bari at Mirpur. There were also other names in the diary including Dr. Wakil Ahmed (Bengali), Dr. Nilima Ibrahim (Bengali), Dr. Latif (IE R), Dr. Maniruzzaman (Geography), K M Saaduddin (Sociology), AMM Shahidullah (Math), Dr. Sirajul Islam (Islamic History), Dr. Akhtar Ahmed (Education), Zahirul Huq (Psychology), Ahsanul Huq (English), Serajul Islam Chowdbury (English), and Kabir Chowdhury (English). 
Another page of his diary recorded the names of 16 collaborating teachers of Dhaka university. Apart from that there were also names of Chowdbury Moinuddin, the chief of operation for elimination of the intelligentsia, and Shawkat Imran, a member of the central Al-Badr command, and the head of Dhaka Al-Badr forces.

The diary also contained names and addresses of several other prominent Bengalis. All of them lost their lives at the hands of Al-Badr forces. On a small piece of paper the name of the member finance of the Pakistan Jute Board, Abdul Khalek, was written down. On December 9, 1971, the Al-Badr forces kidnapped Mr. Khalek from his office. They demanded Taka 10,000 as ransom. They saw Mrs. Khalek for ransom money. But at that time she was unable to pay the kidnappers more than 450 taka. She promised that she would give them the rest of the money later, and begged them her husband's life. But Mr. Khalek never came back.

Ashrafuzzaman has also been implicated in the murder of some journalists. It was Ashrafuzzaman who kidnapped the shift-in- charge of the Purbadesh, and the literary editor, Mr. Golam Mustafa.

War crimes trial

Arrest warrant
On April 25, 2013, the International Crimes Tribunal submitted formal charges against Ashrafuz Zaman Khan on the charge of killing 18 intellectuals towards the end of the Bangladesh liberation war 1971, as the "chief executor" of the Al-Badr force. A total of 16 charges of crimes against humanity have been brought against him under five categories, and an arrest warrant against him has been issued by the tribunal.

Verdict
On November 3, 2013, International war crimes tribunal sentenced Ashrafuz Zaman to death after the tribunal found him guilty of torture and murder of 18 intellectuals including nine Dhaka University teachers, six journalists and three doctors during 1971 Liberation war of Bangladesh. According to International Crimes Tribunal, the prosecution proved all the charges against Ashrafuz beyond doubt.
The tribunal also said that Ashrafuz Zaman and his ally Chowdhury Mueen-uddin at times, carried out the murders, sometimes they instigated and encouraged them and the two had complete control over the Al Badr during the 1971 War.

List of victims killed by Ashrafuz Zaman and Chowdhury Mueen-uddin
A court found Ashrafuz Zaman and Chowdhury Mueen-uddin to be guilty for the murder of following 18 Bengali intellectuals: Dhaka University Professors Ghyasuddin Ahmed, Rashidul Hasan, Anwar Pasha, Faizul Mahi, famous playwright and Professor Munier Chowdhury, Mufazzal Haider Chaudhury, Dr Abul Khair, Dr Santosh Chandra Bhattacharyya and Dr Sirajul Haque Khan, Professor of Cardiology Mohammed Fazle Rabbee, eminent eye specialist AFM Alim Chowdhury, Physician Mohammad Martuza, Novelist and Journalist Shahidullah Kaiser, Journalist and Poet Selina Parvin, Journalists Serajuddin Hossain, Syed Nazmul Haque, ANM Golam Mostafa, and Nizamuddin Ahmed, in between December 10 and 15, 1971.

See also
 Razakars (Pakistan)

References

External links

 An online archive of chronology of events, documentations, audio, video, images, media reports and eyewitness accounts of the 1971 Genocide in Bangladesh in the hands of Pakistan army and their helpers Rajakar, Al-badr, Al-Shams

Living people
People from Lahore
People of the Bangladesh Liberation War
People sentenced to death in absentia
Pakistani prisoners sentenced to death
Prisoners sentenced to death by Bangladesh
1948 births